Vlamecir Nunes Fernandes, known as Atabu (born 20 June 1986) is a Bissau-Guinean football player who plays for Olhanense.

Club career
He made his professional debut in the Segunda Liga for Farense on 10 August 2013 in a game against Portimonense.

Honours
Club
FC Lusitanos - Primera Divisió champion, 2012–13.

References

External links

1986 births
Sportspeople from Bissau
Living people
Bissau-Guinean footballers
Bissau-Guinean expatriate footballers
Expatriate footballers in Portugal
Bissau-Guinean expatriate sportspeople in Portugal
Louletano D.C. players
S.C. Farense players
FC Lusitanos players
Expatriate footballers in Andorra
Liga Portugal 2 players
S.R. Almancilense players

Association football midfielders